The 2013 NCAA Division I FBS football season was the highest level college football competition in the United States organized by the National Collegiate Athletic Association (NCAA).

The regular season began on August 29, 2013 and ended on December 14, 2013. The postseason concluded on January 6, 2014 with the final BCS National Championship Game, played at the Rose Bowl in Pasadena, California.

The Florida State Seminoles beat the Auburn Tigers in the BCS National Championship Game to become the consensus national champion of the 2013 season. This was the final season in which the Bowl Championship Series (BCS) was used to determine the national champion of the Football Bowl Subdivision; the BCS was replaced by the College Football Playoff system starting with the 2014 season.

Rule changes

The following rule changes were made by the NCAA Football Rules Committee for the 2013 season:

 Players who intentionally deliver a blow above the shoulders of a defenseless player (targeting) will now be automatically ejected from the game in addition to the 15-yard penalty assessed. If the ejection occurs in the first half, it is for the remainder of the game. If the ejection occurs in the second half or in overtime, it is for the remainder of the game plus the first half of the next scheduled game. The ejection penalty is automatically reviewed to determine if the hit was intentional; however, the yardage penalty is not reviewable (this rule was later changed for the 2014 season to overturn the yardage penalty if the ejection was overturned).
 Blocking below the waist is now legal if done from the front side of the defender anywhere on the field, while blocks below the waist delivered from the side or back are fouls, simplifying rule changes from the 2011 and 2012 seasons.
 In the final minute of each half, if the clock is stopped solely for an injured player, there will be an option for a 10-second runoff before the ball is put in play to cut down on teams faking injuries to stop the clock.  If the clock is stopped for another reason (first down, incomplete pass, etc.) or if players from both teams are injured on the same play no runoff will occur.
 If the clock is stopped and will restart on the referee's signal with three or more seconds remaining in a half, the ball can be spiked to get an additional play. If one or two seconds remain on the game clock when the ball is spiked, the half or game will end.
 Permitting the use of electronic equipment such as wireless headsets for game officials to communicate with each other.
 Two players at the same position on the same team may not wear the same uniform number (example, two quarterbacks on the same team cannot wear No. 12).
 Players that change numbers during a game must report to the referee, who will announce it via wireless microphone. Failure to report is a 15-yard unsportsmanlike conduct penalty.
 Instant replay will be permitted to adjust the game clock at the end of each quarter. Previously, instant replay could only adjust the game clock at the end of each half.
 Permitting the Big 12 Conference to experiment with an eighth official during conference games, positioned in the offensive backfield opposite the Referee (similar to the positioning of the umpire in the NFL) to assist in detecting infractions (such as holding, chop blocks, blindside hits on the quarterback, etc.) on the offensive line as well as spotting the ball and monitoring substitutions. This official will be referred to as an "alternate referee" and wear an "A" on the back of the uniform. Use of eight-man officiating crews was expanded to all FBS conferences in the 2014 season.

A rule that would have required the colors of uniform jerseys and pants to contrast to the field was recommended by the Rules Committee but was denied by the Playing Rules Oversight Panel. This rule was proposed to prevent teams (such as Boise State) from wearing uniforms that matched the color of their field. Another recommended rule would have switched the side of the field on which the line-to-gain and down markers are displayed in each half but was also denied.

The NCAA Legislative Council also approved a new rule that allows any FBS team with a 6–6 record entering a conference championship game to be bowl-eligible regardless of the result of the title game. Previously, such teams (for example, Georgia Tech last season and UCLA in 2011) had to seek an NCAA waiver if they lost in their conference championship.

Conference realignment

On April 3, 2013, the schools remaining in the original Big East Conference, which had sold the "Big East" name to the seven Catholic schools that would later leave the league to form the new Big East in July 2013, announced that they would operate as the American Athletic Conference (shortened to AAC or "The American). The AAC filled its membership by adding schools from Conference USA, which replaced its losses with former Sun Belt and Western Athletic Conference (WAC) members.

The WAC discontinued football as a sponsored sport after the 2012 season when most of its football-playing members announced their departures for other conferences, primarily the Mountain West, in the preceding years. The WAC became the first FBS (formerly Division I-A) conference to drop football since the Big West Conference did so after the 2000 season. Idaho and New Mexico State, the two WAC football members who remained for 2013 season, temporarily became FBS independents in football. The WAC would not reinstate football until 2021, doing so as an FCS conference.

Membership changes

Other headlines
 May 14 – The University of Hawaiʻi at Mānoa announced that effective July 1, all of the school's men's sports teams would use the nickname Rainbow Warriors, a combination of the school's historic name of "Rainbows" and the "Warriors" nickname used by some teams since 2000. This reversed a plan announced by UH in February 2013, under which all men's teams would use "Warriors", previously used by football, men's golf, and men's volleyball. UH had allowed men's teams to choose their own nicknames in 2000, which resulted in the baseball team using "Rainbows", the three aforementioned teams using "Warriors", and other men's teams using "Rainbow Warriors". The change did not affect UH women's sports, which continue to be known as Rainbow Wahine.
 May 20 – The organizers of the Military Bowl announced that the game, previously held at RFK Stadium in Washington, D.C., would be moved to Navy–Marine Corps Memorial Stadium in Annapolis, Maryland effective with the upcoming 2013 edition.
 September 7 – The 2013 Michigan–Notre Dame game set an NCAA record for attendance in a game with 115,109 fans attending the game at Michigan Stadium (also known as the Big House). Michigan won the game 41–30.
 October 10 – Minnesota and its head coach Jerry Kill jointly announced that Kill would take an indefinite leave of absence, effective immediately, to focus on treatment and management of his epilepsy. Kill had missed the second half of the Golden Gophers' win over Western Illinois on September 14 due to a seizure, and was unable to travel with the team to Michigan on October 5 due to his condition. Minnesota named defensive coordinator Tracy Claeys as interim head coach; Kill returned to the team for the Northwestern game on October 19, but remained in the press box, allowing Claeys to direct the team from the sidelines until resuming on-field duties in the second half of the Texas Bowl.
 November 30 –  In a game whose winner would clinch the SEC West division and a berth in the 2013 SEC Championship Game, the No. 4-ranked Auburn Tigers upset the No. 1 Alabama Crimson Tide in the 2013 Iron Bowl by a score of 34–28. Auburn's Chris Davis returned a missed Alabama field goal attempt for a touchdown on the final play of the game, which was dubbed the "Kick Six." The Iron Bowl was one of the most-watched games of the 2013 season, and the play was widely considered to be one of the greatest moments in the history of college football.

Updated stadiums

Nebraska's Memorial Stadium was expanded.
Kansas State's Bill Snyder Family Stadium was renovated.
Arizona's Arizona Stadium was renovated.
Washington returned to Husky Stadium following a $280 million renovation that began during the 2011 season.
UCLA's Rose Bowl was renovated.
Houston's Robertson Stadium was closed after the 2012 season; a new venue that ultimately became TDECU Stadium opened on the former stadium's site in 2014. The Cougars used Reliant Stadium (home to the Houston Texans) for five of their seven home games in 2013 and two games at BBVA Compass Stadium (home to the Houston Dynamo of MLS).
Massachusetts' Warren McGuirk Alumni Stadium was renovated, maintaining its previous capacity of 17,000, and was planned to be ready by the 2014 season. The Minutemen were to use Gillette Stadium (home to the New England Patriots and New England Revolution) for their entire 2013 home schedule, however the school was also contracted to play at least four home games at Gillette Stadium in each season from 2014 to 2016.
Missouri's Faurot Field underwent renovation, and its seating was temporarily cut from 71,004 to 67,124 for 2013, in preparation for an expansion to 77,000 in 2014.
Texas Tech's Jones AT&T Stadium was renovated with an upgraded video board and colonnade.

Regular season top 10 matchups
Rankings reflect the AP Poll. Rankings for Week 9 and beyond will list BCS Rankings first and AP Poll second. Teams that failed to be a top 10 team for one poll or the other will be noted.
Week 1
No. 8 Clemson defeated No. 5 Georgia, 38–35 (Memorial Stadium, Clemson, South Carolina)
Week 3
No. 1 Alabama defeated No. 6 Texas A&M, 49–42 (Kyle Field, College Station, Texas)
Week 5
No. 9 Georgia defeated No. 6 LSU, 44–41 (Sanford Stadium, Athens, Georgia)
Week 8
No. 5 Florida State defeated No. 3 Clemson, 51–14 (Memorial Stadium, Clemson, South Carolina)
Week 10
No. 3 Florida State defeated No. 7 Miami, 41–14 (Doak Campbell Stadium, Tallahassee, Florida)
Week 11
No. 1/1 Alabama defeated No. 13/10 LSU, 38–17 (Bryant–Denny Stadium, Tuscaloosa, Alabama)
No. 5/6 Stanford defeated No. 3/2 Oregon, 26–20 (Stanford Stadium, Stanford, California)
No. 6/5 Baylor defeated No. 10/12 Oklahoma, 41–12 (Floyd Casey Stadium, Waco, Texas)
Week 13
No. 10/11 Oklahoma State defeated No. 4/3 Baylor, 49–17 (Boone Pickens Stadium, Stillwater, Oklahoma)
Week 14
No. 4/4 Auburn defeated No. 1/1 Alabama, 34–28 (Jordan–Hare Stadium, Auburn, Alabama)
No. 10/10 South Carolina defeated No. 6/6 Clemson, 31–17 (Williams–Brice Stadium, Columbia, South Carolina)
Week 15
No. 3/3 Auburn defeated No. 5/5 Missouri, 59–42 (2013 SEC Championship Game, Georgia Dome, Atlanta, Georgia)
No. 10/10 Michigan State defeated No. 2/2 Ohio State, 34–24 (2013 Big Ten Championship Game, Lucas Oil Stadium, Indianapolis, Indiana)

Conference standings

Conference champions
Rankings reflect the Week 15 AP Poll before the conference championship games were played.

 Louisiana–Lafayette vacated its shared Sun Belt Conference title due to NCAA penalties levied in 2016.

Final BCS rankings

Bowl games

Bowl record by conference

Awards and honors

Heisman Trophy
The Heisman Trophy is given to the year's most outstanding player.

Other major awards
Archie Griffin Award (MVP): Jameis Winston, Florida State
AP Player of the Year: Jameis Winston, Florida State
Chic Harley Award (Player of the Year): Jordan Lynch, Northern Illinois
Maxwell Award (top player): A. J. McCarron, Alabama
SN Player of the Year: Jameis Winston, Florida State
Walter Camp Award (top player): Jameis Winston, Florida State

Special awards
Burlsworth Trophy (top player who began as walk-on): Jared Abbrederis, Wisconsin
Paul Hornung Award (most versatile player): Odell Beckham Jr., LSU
Campbell Trophy ("academic Heisman"): John Urschel, Penn State
Wuerffel Trophy (humanitarian-athlete): Gabe Ikard, Oklahoma

Offense
Quarterback

Davey O'Brien Award (quarterback): Jameis Winston, Florida State
Johnny Unitas Award (senior/4th year quarterback): A. J. McCarron, Alabama
Kellen Moore Award (quarterback): A. J. McCarron, Alabama
Manning Award (quarterback): Jameis Winston, Florida State
Sammy Baugh Trophy (passing quarterback): Derek Carr, Fresno State

Running back

Doak Walker Award (running back): Andre Williams, Boston College
Jim Brown Trophy (running back): Andre Williams, Boston College

Wide receiver

Fred Biletnikoff Award (wide receiver): Brandin Cooks, Oregon State
 Paul Warfield Trophy (wide receiver): Davante Adams, Fresno State

Tight end

John Mackey Award (tight end): Austin Seferian-Jenkins, Washington
Ozzie Newsome Award (tight end): Jace Amaro, Texas Tech

Lineman

Dave Rimington Trophy (center): Bryan Stork, Florida State
Outland Trophy (interior lineman): Aaron Donald, Pittsburgh
Jim Parker Trophy (offensive lineman): Cyril Richardson, Baylor

Defense
Bronko Nagurski Trophy (defensive player): Aaron Donald, Pittsburgh
Chuck Bednarik Award (defensive player): Aaron Donald, Pittsburgh
Lott Trophy (defensive impact): Anthony Barr, UCLA

Defensive line

Bill Willis Award (defensive lineman): Aaron Donald, Pittsburgh
Dick Butkus Award (linebacker): C.J. Mosley, Alabama
Jack Lambert Trophy (linebacker): Khalil Mack, Buffalo
Lombardi Award (defensive lineman): Aaron Donald, Pittsburgh
Ted Hendricks Award (defensive end): Jackson Jeffcoat, Texas

Defensive back

Jim Thorpe Award (defensive back): Darqueze Dennard, Michigan State
Jack Tatum Trophy (defensive back): Darqueze Dennard, Michigan State

Special teams
Lou Groza Award (placekicker): Roberto Aguayo, Florida State
Vlade Award (placekicker): Roberto Aguayo, Florida State
Ray Guy Award (punter): Tom Hornsey, Memphis

Coaches
AFCA Coach of the Year: David Cutcliffe, Duke
AP Coach of the Year: Gus Malzahn, Auburn
Bobby Bowden National Collegiate Coach of the Year Award: Gus Malzahn, Auburn
Bobby Dodd Coach of the Year Award: David Cutcliffe, Duke
Eddie Robinson Coach of the Year: Gus Malzahn, Auburn
 Maxwell Coach of the Year: David Cutcliffe, Duke
Paul "Bear" Bryant Award: Gus Malzahn, Auburn
SN Coach of the Year: Gus Malzahn, Auburn and David Cutcliffe, Duke
The Home Depot Coach of the Year Award: Gus Malzahn, Auburn
Woody Hayes Trophy: Gus Malzahn, Auburn
Walter Camp Coach of the Year: David Cutcliffe, Duke

Assistants
AFCA Assistant Coach of the Year: Chad Morris, offensive coordinator/quarterbacks coach, Clemson
Broyles Award: Pat Narduzzi, defensive coordinator, Michigan State

All-Americans

Coaching changes
This is restricted to coaching changes that took place on or after May 1, 2013. For coaching changes that occurred earlier in 2013, see 2012 NCAA Division I FBS end-of-season coaching changes.

Television viewers and ratings

Most watched regular season games
Excludes Conference Championships (see chart below)

Kickoff games

Conference championship games

See also

 2013 NCAA Division I FBS football rankings

References

External links